Gabija is a Lithuanian feminine given name. 

Gabija (also known as Gabieta, Gabeta) is the goddess of fire and of the hearth of homes in Lithuanian mythology. It was the most popular given name for baby girls born in Lithuania in 2005.

References

Feminine given names
Lithuanian feminine given names